Synopses of the British Fauna is a series of identification guides, published by The Linnean Society and The Estuarine and Coastal Sciences Association. Each volume in the series provides and in-depth analysis of a group of animals and is designed to bridge the gap between the standard field guide and more specialised monograph or treatise. The series is now published by The Field Studies Council on behalf of The Linnean Society and The Estuarine and Coastal Sciences Association. 

The series is designed for use in the field and is kept as user friendly as possible with technical terminology kept to a minimum and a glossary of terms provided, although the complexity of the subject matter makes the books more suitable for the more experienced practitioner.

History of the series 

On 11 March 1943, at a meeting of The Linnean Society in Burlington House, TH Savoy presented his "Synopsis of the Opiliones" (Harvestmen). It was so well received that a decision was made there and then to publish it as the first of a series of "ecological fauna lists".

Re-launched by Dr Doris Kermack in the mid-1960s, the New Series of Synopses of the British Fauna went from strength to strength. From number 13, the series had been jointly sponsored by The Estuarine and Coastal Sciences Association and Dr RSK Barnes became co-editor.

From 1993, the series has been published by The Field Studies Council and benefits from association with the extensive testing undertaken as part of the AIDGAP project.

Volumes 

The series contains the following volumes, many of which are out of print. Many of the volumes have been updated and reprinted under slightly different names to reflect either taxonomic changes or advances in the understanding of a group.

 Volume 62: Marine Gastropods 3: Neogastropoda (Wigham and Graham) 2018
 Volume 61: Marine Gastropods 2: Littorinimorpha and other unassigned Caenogastropoda (Wigham and Graham) 2017
 Volume 60: Marine Gastropods 1: Patellogastropoda and Vetigastropoda (Wigham and Graham) 2017
 Volume 59: Athecate hydroids and their medusae (Shuchert) 2012
 Volume 58: Centipedes (AD Barber) 2009
 Volume 57: Barnacles (AJ Southward) 2008
 Volume 56: Echinoderms (EC Southward and AC Campbell) 2005
 Volume 55: Lobsters, Mud Shrimps and Anomuran Crabs (RW Ingle and ME Christiansen) 2004
 Volume 54: Polychaetes: British Chrysopetaloidea, Pisionoidea and Aphroditoidea (SJ Chambers and AI Muir) 1998
 Volume 53: Free Living British Nematodes, Part 3 Monohysterids (RM Warwick, HM Platt and PJ Somerfield) 1998
 Volume 52: Ticks of North-West Europe (Paul D Hillyard) 1996
 Volume 51: Marine and Brackish Water Harpacticoid Copepods, Part 1 (R Huys, JM Gee, CG Moore and R Hamond) 1996
 Volume 50: North-west European Thecate Hydroids and Their Medusae (PFS Cornelius) 1995
 Volume 49: Woodlice Keys and Notes for Identification of the Species (PG Oliver and CJ Meechan) 1993
 Volume 48: Marine Planktonic Ostracods (MV Angel) 1993
 Volume 47: Copepods Parasitic on Fishes (Z Kabata) 1992
 Volume 46: Commensal and Parasitic Copepods Associated with Marine Invertebrates (and Whales) (V Gotto) 1993
 Volume 45: Polychaetes British Phyllodocoideans, Typhloscolecoideans and Tomopteroideans (F Pleijel and RP Dales) 1991
 Volume 44: Polychaetes: Interstitial Families (Second Edition) (W Westheide) 2008
 Volume 44: Polychaetes: Interstitial Families (W Westheide) 1990
 Volume 43: Marine and Brackish Water Ostracods (Superfamilies Cypridacea and Cytheracea) (J Athersuch, DJ Horne and JE Whittaker) 1990
 Volume 42: Freshwater Ostracoda (PA Henderson) 1990
 Volume 41: Entoprocts (C Nielsen) 1989
 Volume 40: Pseudoscorpions (G Legg and RE Jones) 1988
 Volume 39: Chaetognatha (AC Pierrot-Bults and KC Chidghey) 1988
 Volume 38: Free Living Marine Nematodes Part II British Chromadorids (HM Platt and RM Warwick) 1988
 Volume 37: Molluscs Caudofoveata, Solenogastres, Polyplacophora and Scaphopoda (AM Jones and JM Baxtyer) 1987
 Volume 36: Halacarid Mites (J Green and M Macquitty) 1987
 Volume 35: Millipedes (J Gordon Blower) 1985
 Volume 34: Cyclostome Bryozoans (PJ Hayward and JS Ryland) 1985
 Volume 33: Ctenostome Bryozoans (PJ Hayward) 1985
 Volume 32: Polychaetes British Amphinomida, Spintherida and Eunicida (JD George and G Hartmann-Schroder) 1985
 Volume 31: Earthworms (RW Sims and BM Garard) 1985
 Volume 30: Euphasiid, Stomatopod and Leptostracan Crustaceans (J Mauchline) 1984
 Volume 29: Siphonophores and Velellids (PA Kirkpatrick and PR Pugh) 1984
 Volume 28: Free-Living Marine Nematodes Pt 1: British Enoplids Free Living Marine Nematodes (HM Platt and RM Warwick) 1983
 Volume 27: Tanaids (DM Holdich and JA Jones) 1983
 Volume 26: British Polyclad Turbellarians (S Prudhoe) 1983
 Volume 25: Shallow Water Crabs Keys and notes for identification of the species (RW Ingle) 1983
 Volume 24: Nemerteans R Gibson 1982
 Volume 23: British and Other Freshwater Ciliated Protozoa (Part 2) Ciliophora: Oligohymenophora & Polyhymenophora (CR Curds, MA Gates and D McRoberts) 1982
 Volume 22: British and Other Freshwater Ciliated Protozoa (Part 1) Ciliophora: Kinetofragminophora (CR Curds) 1982
 Volume 21: British Other Marine Estuarine Oligochaetes (Brinkhurst) 1982
 Volume 20: British Pelagic Tunicates (JH Fraser) 1982
 Volume 19: British Planarians (IR Ball and TB Reynoldson) 1981
 Volume 18: British Anthozoa (RL Manuel) 1981
 Volume 17: British Brachiopods (C Howard, C Brunton and GB Curry) 1979
 Volume 16: British Nearshore Foraminiferids (JW Murray) 1979
 Volume 15: Coastal Shrimps and Prawns Keys and Notes for Identification of the Species (Ed. G Smaldon, LB Holthius and CHJM Fransen) 1994
 Volume 15: British Coastal Shrimps Prawns (G Smaldon) 1979
 Volume 14: Cheilostomatous Bryozoa, Part 2 Hippothooidea - Celleporoidea (PJ Hayward and JS Ryland) 1999
 Volume 14: British Ascophoran Bryozoans (PJ Hayward, JS Ryland) 1979
 Volume 13: British and Other Phoronids (CC Emig) 1979
 Volume 12: Sipunculans (PE Gibbs) 2001
 Volume 12: British Sipunculans (PE Gibbs) 1978
 Volume 11: British Freshwater Bivalve Mollusca (AE Ellis) 1978
 Volume 10: Cheilostomatous Bryozoa, Part 1: Aeteoidea-Cribrilinoidea (PJ Hayward and JS Ryland)
 Volume 8: Molluscs: Benthic Opisthobranchs (Mollusca: Gastropoda) (TE Thompson) 1989
 Volume 8: British Opisthobranch Molluscs (TE Thompson, GH Brown) 1976
 Volume 7: British Cumaceans (NS Jones) 1976
 Volume 6: British Land Snails (RAD Cameron, M Redfern) 1976
 Volume 5: Sea-Spiders (Pycnogonida) of the north-east Atlantic (RN Bamber) 2010
 Volume 5: British Sea Spiders (PE King) 1974
 Volume 4: Harvestmen (PD Hillyard) 2005
 Volume 4: British Harvestmen (J Sankey, TH Savory) 1974
 Volume 3: Intertidal Marine Isopods (E Naylor, A Brandt) 2015
 Volume 3: British Marine Isopods (E Naylor) 1972
 Volume 2: Molluscs: Prosobranch and Pyramidellid Gastropods Keys and Notes for the Identification of the Species
 Volume 1: British Ascidians (R Millar) 1970

External links
 Linnean Society
 Full list of Synopses in print

Biological literature
Fauna of the United Kingdom
Natural history
Taxonomy (biology) books
Zoological literature